Apaturia were ancient Greek festivals held annually by all the Ionian towns, except Ephesus and Colophon. At Athens the Apaturia took place on the 11th, 12th and 13th days of the month of Pyanepsion (mid-October to mid-November), on which occasion the various phratries, or clans, of Attica met to discuss their affairs.

On the first day of the festival, called Dorpia or Dorpeia (Δορπεία), banquets were held towards evening at the meeting-place of the phratries or in the private houses of members.

On the third day, Kureōtis, children born since the last festival were presented by their fathers or guardians to the assembled phratores, and, after an oath had been taken as to their legitimacy and the sacrifice of a goat or a sheep, their names were inscribed in the register. The sacrificial animal was called μείον. The children who entered puberty also made offerings of wine to Hercules. On this day also it was the custom for boys still at school to declaim pieces of poetry, and to receive prizes.

According to Hesychius, these three days of the festival were followed by a fourth, called , but this is merely a general term for the day after any festival.

See also
 Athenian festivals

References 

Festivals in ancient Ionia
Festivals in ancient Athens
October observances
November observances